Terranjou is a commune in the department of Maine-et-Loire, western France. The municipality was established on 1 January 2017 by merger of the former communes of Chavagnes (the seat), Martigné-Briand and Notre-Dame-d'Allençon.

See also 
Communes of the Maine-et-Loire department

References 

Communes of Maine-et-Loire
States and territories established in 2017